Siroliya railway station is a railway station on Indore–Gwalior line under the Bhopal railway division of West Central Railway zone. This is situated at Tehsil Shajapur, Sihoda in Shajapur district of the Indian state of Madhya Pradesh.

References

Railway stations in Shajapur district
Bhopal railway division